The Macquarie Island Station is a permanent Australian subantarctic research base on Macquarie Island, commonly called Macca, situated in the Southern Ocean and located approximately halfway between mainland Australia and Antarctica, managed by the Australian Antarctic Division (AAD). The station lies at the base of Wireless Hill, between two bays on the isthmus at the northern end of the island.

The island and its surrounding waters are administered as a nature reserve by the Tasmanian Government Parks and Wildlife Service. In 1997 the island was inscribed on the UNESCO World Heritage List as a site of major geoconservation significance, being the only place on earth where rocks from the earth's mantle are actively exposed above sea-level.

Purpose
The research station is operated by the Australian Antarctic Division. Scientific research on the island is focused around biology, geosciences, meteorology, and human impact on the environment. Macquarie island birds breed on the island so wildlife management and counting is key to a number of research projects. Monitoring is also undertaken for the Australian Radiation Protection and Nuclear Safety Agency to detect radioactive debris from atmospheric explosions or vented by underground or underwater nuclear explosions. Macquarie Island is an important global monitoring location for scientific research, including monitoring southern hemisphere climatic data by Geoscience Australia.

Facilities
Various buildings exist, some dating back to the early 1950s: Sleeping quarters are in Southern Aurora Dongas (SAD), Garden Cove (Dorm), Hasselborough House and Cumpston's Cottage. A combined mess and kitchen adjoin the doctor's surgery. Storage exists in the main store shed and a large field store shed. The various trades there have their own workshops. A main and standby powerhouse provides electricity and reticulated heating water via a heat exchanger on the diesel generators. Water is sourced from a dam at the top of Gadget's Gully and piped to storage tanks at the station. Sewage is treated before discharge and garbage is sorted for recycling (back in Hobart) or incineration on site. Scientific facilities exist in the Biology Building, Physics Building and Bureau of Meteorology buildings. Various outbuildings support instrumentation such as ionosondes, seismometers and upper atmospheric experiments. A tide gauge is installed in Garden Cove.

Communications
The radiocommunications station has callsign "VJM" and conducts a nightly HF radio schedule with the field huts on 3023 kHz (time varies depending on season and staff preferences). Communications with Australia are conducted using the ANARESAT Earth station facility which utilises the Intelsat Pacific Ocean satellite. Inmarsat and Iridium Satellite LLC portable units are used as a backup. A network of VHF radio repeaters is utilised with handheld transceivers by bushwalkers on the island. The base has an Internet Protocol network for local PC and VoIP equipment.

History
The station was opened in 1911 by Douglas Mawson as his party established a base to relay radio messages from Antarctica to Hobart, Tasmania. From 1948 the Australian National Antarctic Research Expeditions used the base for scientific purposes.

See also
Amateur radio call signs of Antarctica
 List of Antarctic research stations
 List of Antarctic field camps

References

External links

Macquarie Island on AAD

Macquarie Island
Research stations
1911 establishments in Australia
Earth stations in the Antarctic Territory Australia